Geoff Steel is a British auto racing driver and engineer.  As a driver, he entered selected rounds of the British Touring Car Championship in 1994, with a privately entered BMW 318iS In 1997 and 1998 he competed in the British GT Championship.

He and his Geoff Steel Racing team has developed and raced cars for track and rally, mainly from the BMW marque. The team has run a BMW 320i in 2006 and 2007 for Martyn Bell. The team return to the BTCC in 2011 with a BMW 320si for reigning Renault Clio Cup champion, Dave Newsham.

Racing record

Complete British Touring Car Championship results
(key) (Races in bold indicate pole position) (Races in italics indicate fastest lap)

References

External links
Official site
Geoff Steel at driver database.

Living people
British Touring Car Championship drivers
Sports car racing team owners
Year of birth missing (living people)